The meridian 5° west of Greenwich is a line of longitude that extends from the North Pole across the Arctic Ocean, the Atlantic Ocean, Europe, Africa, the Southern Ocean, and Antarctica to the South Pole.

The 5th meridian west forms a great circle with the 175th meridian east.

From Pole to Pole
Starting at the North Pole and heading south to the South Pole, the 5th meridian west passes through:

{| class="wikitable plainrowheaders"
! scope="col" width="120" | Co-ordinates
! scope="col" | Country, territory or sea
! scope="col" | Notes
|-
| style="background:#b0e0e6;" | 
! scope="row" style="background:#b0e0e6;" | Arctic Ocean
| style="background:#b0e0e6;" |
|-
| style="background:#b0e0e6;" | 
! scope="row" style="background:#b0e0e6;" | Atlantic Ocean
| style="background:#b0e0e6;" |
|-
| 
! scope="row" | 
| Scotland
|-valign="top"
| style="background:#b0e0e6;" | 
! scope="row" style="background:#b0e0e6;" | Firth of Clyde
| style="background:#b0e0e6;" | Passing between the Isle of Bute and The Cumbraes, Scotland,  (at ) Passing just east of the Isle of Arran, Scotland,  (at )
|-
| 
! scope="row" | 
| Scotland — passing just east of Stranraer (at )
|-valign="top"
| style="background:#b0e0e6;" | 
! scope="row" style="background:#b0e0e6;" | Irish Sea
| style="background:#b0e0e6;" | Passing just west of the Calf of Man,  (at ) Passing just west of Bardsey Island, Wales,  (at )
|-
| 
! scope="row" | 
| Wales — passing just west of Haverfordwest (at )
|-
| style="background:#b0e0e6;" | 
! scope="row" style="background:#b0e0e6;" | Celtic Sea
| style="background:#b0e0e6;" | 
|-
| 
! scope="row" | 
| England — passing just east of Truro (at )
|-valign="top"
| style="background:#b0e0e6;" | 
! scope="row" style="background:#b0e0e6;" | Atlantic Ocean
| style="background:#b0e0e6;" | English Channel Passing just east of the island of Ushant,  (at ) Iroise Sea Bay of Biscay — from 
|-
| 
! scope="row" | 
|
|-
| style="background:#b0e0e6;" | 
! scope="row" style="background:#b0e0e6;" | Mediterranean Sea
| style="background:#b0e0e6;" | Alboran Sea
|-
| 
! scope="row" | 
| Passing through Fez (at )
|-
| 
! scope="row" | 
|
|-
| 
! scope="row" | 
| For about 12 km
|-valign="top"
| 
! scope="row" | 
|
|-
| 
! scope="row" | 
|
|-
| 
! scope="row" | 
|
|-
| style="background:#b0e0e6;" | 
! scope="row" style="background:#b0e0e6;" | Atlantic Ocean
| style="background:#b0e0e6;" |
|-
| style="background:#b0e0e6;" | 
! scope="row" style="background:#b0e0e6;" | Southern Ocean
| style="background:#b0e0e6;" |
|-
| 
! scope="row" | Antarctica
| Queen Maud Land — claimed by 
|-
|}

See also
4th meridian west
6th meridian west

w005 meridian west